The Grand Prix Waregem was a cycling race held annually in Belgium. It was part of UCI Europe Tour in category 1.2U from 2005 to 2007. The race was considered to be the Under 23 version of Dwars door Vlaanderen.

Winners

References

Cycle races in Belgium
UCI Europe Tour races
Recurring sporting events established in 1980
Recurring sporting events disestablished in 2011
1980 establishments in Belgium
2011 disestablishments in Belgium
Defunct cycling races in Belgium
Sport in West Flanders